The Black Cap was a pub in Camden Town, London known for its drag cabaret, and popular from the mid-1960s until it closed in April 2015.

History
The pub was initially called the Mother Black Cap after a local legend concerning a witch, and had that name, according to licensing records, as early as 1751.

In the winter of 1965/66 the pub became predominantly known for a homosexual clientele, and in the later 20th century it became known for its drag queen cabaret, and promoted itself as the "Palladium of drag". Drag acts under the 'Baton' of Tony Page, who became the first Resident Compére from 1969 until 1976 and Resident Duo Frankie Rae and David Thallon, Hinge and Bracket started their careers at the pub.

A notable regular performer at The Black Cap was Rex Jameson's drag persona, Mrs Shufflewick. A performance was recorded there in 1972. Rex Jameson was a variety artist who hit the big time in the 1950s and 1960s, and went on to attract audiences in the 1970s. The character Mrs Shufflewick was celebrated by artists such as Danny La Rue, Roy Hudd, Bob Monkhouse, Barry Cryer and Barry Humphries. 
Mrs Shufflewick appeared weekly for Sunday lunch during the 1970s. A Hammond organ played by Frankie Rae and drum kit played by David Thallon took pride of place on a tiny stage upon which Mrs Shufflewick performed two shows, usually with fellow-artiste Marc Fleming. Sunday crowds were large and included Charles Hawtrey, Barry Humphries and Barry Cryer.

Jameson died in 1983 and in memorial, the upstairs bar was called The Shufflewick Bar. Jojo Martin said of Rex Jameson, "Rex Jameson was a genius at his craft, I think the book written about him, ('The Amazing Mrs Shufflewick'), is a very apt title, he was amazing, looking at the photograph on the dust jacket, it is no wonder many thought Rex really was Mrs Shufflewick, rather than a female impersonation act, he should never be forgotten and should always be remembered with the other greats, such as Arthur Lucan (Old Mother Riley) and George Logan and Patrick Fyffe Hinge and Bracket".

The Black Cap was a favourite haunt of the serial killer Dennis Nilsen, who used it to pick up his victims, and of Anthony Hardy, "The Camden Ripper", who dumped the dismembered bodies of his victims behind the College Arms pub in Crowndale Road (now demolished).

During the 1980s, artists such as Reg Bundy who began his Cabaret 'life' as part of the triple Act "The Disappointer Sisters", performed his alter ego Regina Fong on Tuesday nights, attracting a following of "Fongettes". Top drag acts such as Adrela and Lily Savage also appeared at The Cap during the eighties.

The pub in the 1986 film Withnail & I is the "Mother Black Cap" (which stood in Tavistock Crescent). Its name was possibly a combination of The Black Cap, and another Camden pub, The Mother Red Cap.

In more recent times The Black Cap had become home to The Meth Lab, a night of queer cabaret featuring Meth and the Familyyy Fierce. The Meth Lab hosted a number of stars from RuPaul's Drag Race including Season 6's Bianca Del Rio, Adore Delano, and BenDeLaCreme, Season 3 winner Raja Gemini, and Season 7's Trixie Mattel.

In 2013, The Black Cap hosted theatrical events including a Queer interpretation of Macbeth, raising money for the Terrence Higgins Trust.

Owners Faucet Inn closed the pub on 12 April 2015 following controversial plans to redevelop the site.

References

External links
Archived website at Wayback Machine

Tourist attractions in the London Borough of Camden
LGBT pubs in London
Camden Town
Pubs in the London Borough of Camden
Former pubs in London